In the Latin Quarter is a 1915 silent short film directed by Lionel Belmore and starring Edith Storey and Antonio Moreno. It was produced and distributed by the Vitagraph Company of America.

The film survives incomplete in the Library of Congress collection.

Cast
Edith Storey - Marie Duval
Antonio Moreno - Andrew Lenique
S. Rankin Drew - Jean Duval (*as Sidney Rankin Drew)
Constance Talmadge - Manon
William R. Dunn

References

External links
In the Latin Quarter at IMDb.com

1915 films
Vitagraph Studios short films
American silent short films
American black-and-white films
1910s American films